St. Lawrence College or St. Laurence College may refer to:

 St Laurence's College, a Catholic secondary school in Brisbane, Australia
 Cégep de Saint-Laurent, in Montreal, Quebec, Canada
 St. Lawrence College, Ontario, in Kingston, Canada
 St Lawrence College, Athens, Greece
 St Lawrence College, Ramsgate, United Kingdom

See also 
 St. Lawrence University (disambiguation)
 Saint Lawrence (disambiguation)